Kenneth Priestlay (born August 24, 1967) is a Canadian former ice hockey player. He played in the National Hockey League with the Buffalo Sabres and Pittsburgh Penguins between 1986 and 1992. With the Penguins he won the Stanley Cup in 1992. Priestlay also spent several years playing in the British Hockey League and Ice Hockey Superleague before retiring in 1999, though he briefly played again in 2002–03.

Career statistics

Regular season and playoffs

Source: www.hockeydb.com

Awards and achievements
 WHL West Second All-Star Team – 1986, 1987
 Stanley Cup — 1992

Bibliography
An autobiography was co-written with Bob Westerdale entitled "Lord Of The Rinks", published by Breedon Books Publishing in September 1997.

Post-Hockey
Currently working in Vancouver, BC as General Manager at Dunbar Lumber Supply, and contributes to sport radio on Sportsnet 650.

External links
 

1967 births
Living people
Buffalo Sabres draft picks
Buffalo Sabres players
Canadian expatriate sportspeople in the United States
Canadian expatriate ice hockey players in England
Canadian ice hockey centres
Cleveland Lumberjacks players
Kalamazoo Wings (1974–2000) players
Muskegon Lumberjacks players
People from Richmond, British Columbia
Pittsburgh Penguins players
Rochester Americans players
Sheffield Steelers players
Ice hockey people from Vancouver
Stanley Cup champions
Victoria Cougars (WHL) players